The Serie B of the Brazilian Championship 2013 was a football competition held in Brazil, equivalent to the second division. It is contested by 20 clubs, between May 24 and November 30. The top four teams will have access to Série A in 2014 and the last four will be relegated to Série C in 2014.

The games had a break during the 2013 FIFA Confederations Cup, which was held between June and July in Brazil. The competition was played for six rounds before the stoppage.

Teams

Stadia and locations

Personnel and kits

League table

Results

External links
Official webpage 
Official regulations 

Campeonato Brasileiro Série B seasons
2
Brazi